The Faith of a Child is a 1915 British silent drama film directed by Floyd Martin Thornton and starring Evelyn Boucher, Rolf Leslie and Bert Grahame.

Cast
 Evelyn Boucher as Mother  
 Rolf Leslie as Landlord  
 Bert Grahame

References

Bibliography
 Ashish Rajadhyaksha & Paul Willemen. Encyclopedia of Indian Cinema. Routledge, 2014.

External links

1915 films
1915 drama films
British silent feature films
British drama films
1910s English-language films
Films directed by Floyd Martin Thornton
British black-and-white films
1910s British films
Silent drama films